The East Asia Super League, abbreviated as the EASL, is an international basketball league featuring clubs from Hong Kong, Japan, South Korea, Philippines and Taiwan.

From 2017 to 2019, four pre-season tournaments (the Super 8 and the Terrific 12) were organized by EASL, featuring clubs from selected professional basketball leagues in the region. With official backing from FIBA Asia, EASL has made a transition towards a full-fledged league. The first such season is to be held in 2023 and feature eight teams.

History
The East Asia Super League was co-founded by Matt Beyer and Henry Kerins as the Asia League as a response to what the founders deem as a lack of high-level international tournaments featuring basketball clubs in the region also taking into account the population in the region, about 2 billion, which could be a potential market for a regional inter-club tournament. The Asia League was envisioned to be East Asian counterpart of the NBA's Las Vegas Summer League where professional teams from Asia could compete against each other with minimal conflict with their mother league's schedules. 

Their stated mission is to be able to organized basketball tournaments featuring club sides from top Asian leagues with the organizers naming the CBA (China), B.League (Japan), KBL (South Korea), PBA (Philippines), SBL (Chinese Taipei), and the ABL (Southeast Asia, China, and Taiwan).

Preseason tournaments era (2017–2020)

The Super 8
The first tournament by EASL, then called the Asia League, was the Super 8: Macau Basketball Invitational, involving eight teams in September 2017 at the Studio City Event Centre in Macau. The competing teams in attendance were the Zhejiang Guangsha Lions, Shenzhen Aviators (formerly Shenzhen Leopards), Goyang Orions, Seoul Samsung Thunders, Fubon Braves, Pauian Archiland, Chiba Jets, and Ryukyu Golden Kings.

Organizers initially dubbed the tournament as the "Asia League," but this led to a legal dispute with FIBA over the name of the league when FIBA deemed the tournament's branding and marketing to be in conflict with its own FIBA Asia Champions Cup. The dispute led to the renaming of the competition to "Super 8," and the tournament was then officially recognized by FIBA after the league organizers sought legal assistance of Quinn Emanuel's Thomas Werlen, who has represented FIFA in investigations of the United States Department of Justice.

The inaugural Super 8 tournament was won by the Chiba Jets of the Japanese B. League, with the Zhejiang Guangsha Lions placing second and the Goyang Orions taking third place. The event garnered 21 million views worldwide.

A second edition of the tournament, dubbed the Summer Super 8, followed in July 2018 at the Macau East Asian Games Dome, and featured the introduction of two professional club teams from the PBA, the NLEX Road Warriors and Blackwater Elite. The eight competing teams in attendance were the Guangzhou Loong Lions, Xinjiang Flying Tigers, Seoul Samsung Thunders, Incheon Electroland Elephants, NLEX Road Warriors, Blackwater Elite, Rizing Zephyr Fukuoka, and Formosa Dreamers. The Guangzhou Loong Lions won first place, while the Seoul Samsung Thunders took second place and the Incheon Electroland Elephants placed third.

The Terrific 12

In 2018, the Super 8 tournament was expanded into a larger tournament format called The Terrific 12, featuring 12 teams instead of eight. The Terrific 12 (2018) tournament was organized in collaboration with and supported by the Sports Bureau of Macau SAR government and hosted at the Studio City Event Centre.

The competing teams were the Shandong Heroes (formerly Shandong Golden Stars), Zhejiang Guangsha Lions, Xinjiang Flying Tigers, Ulsan Hyundai Mobis Phoebus, Seoul Samsung Thunders, Fubon Braves, Yulon Luxgen Dinos, Nagoya Diamond Dolphins, Ryukyu Golden Kings and Chiba Jets. The Ryukyu Golden Kings won first place, while the Guangzhou Loong Lions placed second and the Seoul Samsung Thunders took third place.

In 2019, Asia League rebranded to the "East Asia Super League," and it hosted the second iteration of The Terrific 12 at the Tap Seac Multi-Sports Pavilion in Macau from September 17–22. The competing teams were the Liaoning Flying Leopards, Shenzhen Aviators, Zhejiang Guangsha Lions, Chiba Jets, Niigata Albirex BB, Ryukyu Golden Kings, Utsonomiya BREX, Jeonju KCC Egis, Seoul SK Knights, Blackwater Elite, TNT KaTropa and San Miguel Beermen.

Terrific 12 (2019) also featured the EASL debut of former NBA player and CBA import Lance Stephenson, who earned MVP awards for his 34-point outburst in the Terrific 12 (2019) championship finals, a close 83–82 finish for the Liaoning Flying Leopards over the Seoul SK Knights. The Zhejiang Guangsha Lions won second place and the San Miguel Beermen took home third in the event.

Plans for a 2020 iteration of The Terrific 12 tournament on September  have been cancelled due to the COVID-19 pandemic.

2022 league plans
In August 2020, EASL and FIBA entered into a multi-year agreement granting EASL FIBA's recognition to hold a full-fledged in-season league featuring clubs from Japan, South Korea, the Philippines, and "Greater China". The inaugural season will feature 8 teams. The teams will play home-and-away games against each other with the top four teams advancing to a Final Four event. It marks the first integrated club-to-club championship league for the East Asia region. However the planned inaugural season was postponed by a year.

For representation of mainland China, Hong Kong and Taiwan, a franchise was formed for the EASL which includes players from the Chinese Basketball Association. The P. League+ also agreed to send a team. While initially foregoing from joining due to the COVID-19 pandemic, the Philippine Basketball Association agreed to participate in the EASL and will be sending two teams within the top four of a select conference. The also had concluded discussion with a league from South Korea.

The Raine Group along with former NBA stars such as Metta Sandiford-Artest, Baron Davis and Shane Battier in December 2021 reportedly invested in the EASL.

Future plans 
The EASL plans to accommodate 16 teams by the third season as well as include more representation from other domestic leagues.

Leagues represented
The planned 2023 East Asia Super League will be represented by teams from selected domestic leagues. Besides them, under the agreement with the Hong Kong Basketball Association and Chun Yu Basketball Club, the Bay Area Chun Yu Phoenixes were formed to participate as a franchise team in the EASL. The league considers the franchise team and the P. League+ championship team of Taiwan as representatives of "Greater China".

Preseason tournaments 
The following leagues were represented in the EASL's preseason tournaments from 2017 to 2020.

Tournament champions

Summary

Super 8 (2017–2018)

The Terrific 12 (2018–2019)

East Asia Super League (2023—present)

Medal table

Preseason tournaments era (2017–2020)

See also
ASEAN Basketball League
EuroLeague
FIBA Asia Champions Cup
William Jones Cup

References

Multi-national basketball leagues in Asia
Recurring sporting events established in 2016
Sports organisations of Hong Kong
Basketball in Macau
Professional sports leagues in China
Multi-national professional sports leagues
2016 establishments in Hong Kong